The Massalikoul Djinane Mosque is a mosque in Dakar, Senegal.

History
In the early 2000s, the land where the mosque stands today was donated by President Abdoulaye Wade. The construction then took place for around 15 years by Consortium des Entreprises du Sénégal and eventually the mosque was opened on 27 September 2019.

Architecture
The mosque spans over an area of 10,000 m2, making it the largest mosque in West Africa. It consists of five minarets with a height of 80 meters, 4 wooden domes, all in which can accommodate up to 10,000 worshipers inside the building and additional 20,000 at its square. The total construction cost was XOF20 billion.

See also
 Islam in Senegal

References

2019 establishments in Senegal
Mosques in Senegal
Mosques completed in 2019
Buildings and structures in Dakar